Zero waste is a set of principles focused on waste prevention that encourage redesigning resource life cycles so that all products are repurposed (i.e. “up-cycled”) and/or reused. The goal of the movement is to avoid sending trash to landfills, incinerators, the ocean, or any other part of the environment. Currently, only 9% of global plastic is recycled. In a zero waste system, materials would be reused until the optimum level of consumption is reached. The definition adopted by the Zero Waste International Alliance (ZWIA) is:

Zero Waste: The conservation of all resources by means of responsible production, consumption, reuse and, recovery of all products, packaging, and materials, without burning them and without discharges to land, water, or air that threaten the environment or human health.

Zero waste refers to waste prevention as opposed to end-of-pipe waste management.  It is a “whole systems” approach that aims for a massive change in the way materials flow through society, resulting in no waste. Zero waste encompasses more than eliminating waste through reducing, reusing, and recycling. It focuses on restructuring distribution and production systems to reduce waste. Zero waste provides guidelines for continually working towards eliminating waste.

Advocates expect that government regulation is needed to influence industrial choices over product and packaging design, manufacturing processes, and material selection.
 
Advocates say eliminating waste decreases pollution, and can also reduce costs due to the reduced need for raw materials.

Cradle-to-Grave 

The cradle-to-grave is a linear material model that begins with resource extraction, moves to product manufacturing, and ends with a "grave" or landfill where the product is disposed of. Cradle-to-grave is in direct contrast to cradle-to-cradle materials or products, which are recycled into new products at the end of their lives so that ultimately there is no waste.

Cradle-to-cradle focuses on designing industrial systems so that materials flow in closed-loop cycles, which means that waste is minimized and waste products can be recycled and reused. Cradle-to-cradle goes beyond dealing with waste issues after it has been created by addressing problems at the source and redefining problems by focusing on design.  The cradle-to-cradle model is sustainable and considerate of life and future generations.

The cradle-to-cradle framework has evolved steadily from theory to practice.  In the industrial sector, it is creating a new notion of materials and material flows. Just as in the natural world, in which one organism's "waste" cycles through an ecosystem to provide nourishment for other living things, cradle-to-cradle materials circulate in closed-loop cycles, providing nutrients for nature or industry.

The spread of industrialization worldwide has been accompanied by a large increase in waste production. In 2012 the World Bank stated that 1.3 billion tons of municipal waste was produced by urban populations and estimates that the number will reach 2.2 billion tons by 2025 (Global Solid Waste Management Market - Analysis and Forecast). The increase in solid waste production increases the need for landfills. With the increase in urbanization, these landfills are being placed closer to communities. These landfills are disproportionately located in areas of low socioeconomic status with primarily non-white populations. Findings indicated these areas are often targeted as waste sites because permits are more easily acquired and there was generally less community resistance.  Additionally, within the last five years, more than 400 hazardous waste facilities have received formal enforcement actions for unspecified violations that were considered to be a risk to human health.

There is a growing global population that is faced with limited resources from the environment.[7] To relieve the pressures placed on the finite resources available it has become more important to prevent waste. To achieve zero waste, waste management has to move from a linear system to be more cyclical so that materials, products, and substances are used as efficiently as possible. Materials must be chosen so that they may either return safely to a cycle within the environment or remain viable in the industrial cycle.[8]

Zero waste promotes not only reuse and recycling but, more importantly, it promotes prevention and product designs that consider the entire product life cycle.[8] Zero-waste designs strive for reduced material use, use of recycled materials, use of more benign materials, longer product lives, repairability, and ease of disassembly at end of life.[3] Zero waste strongly supports sustainability by protecting the environment, reducing costs and producing additional jobs in the management and handling of wastes back into the industrial cycle.[8] A Zero waste strategy may be applied to businesses, communities, industrial sectors, schools, and homes.

Benefits proposed by advocates include:
 Saving money. Since waste is a sign of inefficiency, the reduction of waste can reduce costs.
 Faster Progress. A zero-waste strategy improves upon production processes and improves environmental prevention strategies which can lead to taking larger, more innovative steps.
 Supports sustainability. A zero-waste strategy supports all three of the generally accepted goals of sustainability - economic well-being, environmental protection, and social well-being.[8]
 Improved material flows. A zero-waste strategy would use far fewer new raw materials and send no waste materials to landfills. Any material waste would either return as reusable or recycled materials or would be suitable for use as compost.[8]

Health 

A major issue with landfills is hydrogen sulfide, which is released from the natural decay of waste. Studies have shown a positive association between increased lung cancer mortality rates and increased morbidity and mortality related to respiratory disease and hydrogen sulfide exposure. These studies also showed that the hydrogen sulfide exposure increased with proximity to the landfill.

Household chemicals and prescription drugs are increasingly being found in large quantities in the leachate from landfills. This is causing concern about the ability of landfills to contain these materials and the possibility of these chemicals and drugs making their way into the groundwater and the surrounding environment.

Zero waste promotes a circular material flow that allows materials to be used over and over, reducing the need for landfill space. Through zero waste the number of toxins released into the air and water would be decreased and products examined to determine what chemicals are used in the production process.

Health issues related to landfills:
 Birth defects, low birth weight, and exposure to particulates and nitrogen dioxide are associated with close proximity to landfills.
 Respiratory diseases and lung cancers are related to the release of hydrogen sulfide from landfills.
Zero waste promotion of a cyclical product life can help reduce the need to create and fill landfills. This can help reduce incidents of respiratory diseases and birth defects that are associated with the toxins released from landfills. Zero waste can also help preserve local environments and potable water sources by preventing pollutants from entering the ecosystem.

History

2002–2003 

The movement gained publicity and reached a peak in 1998–2002, and since then has been moving from "theory into action" by focusing on how a "zero waste community" is structured and behaves. The website of the Zero Waste International Alliance has a listing of communities across the globe that have created public policies to promote zero-waste practices. There is a zero-waste organization named the GrassRoots Recycling Network that puts on workshops and conferences about zero-waste activities.

The California Integrated Waste Management Board established a zero waste goal in 2001.  The City and County of San Francisco’s Department of the Environment established a goal of zero waste in 2002, which led to the City's Mandatory Recycling and Composting Ordinance in 2009. With its ambitious goal of zero waste and policies, San Francisco reached a record-breaking 80% diversion rate in 2010, the highest diversion rate in any North American city. San Francisco received a perfect score in the waste category in the Siemens US and Canada Green City Index, which named San Francisco the greenest city in North America.

2009: The Zero Waste lifestyle movement emerges 

In 2008, Zero Waste was a term used to describe manufacturing and municipal waste management practices. Bea Johnson, a French American woman living in California, decided to apply it to her household of 4. In 2009, she started sharing her journey through her blog, Zero Waste Home, and in 2010, was featured in The New York Times. The article, which introduced the mainstream to the concept of waste-free living, received much criticism from people confusing it for a bohemian lifestyle. These critical reviews began to shift after images of the family and their interior was widely broadcast in worldwide media. In 2013, Johnson published Zero Waste Home: The Ultimate Guide to Simplifying your Life by Reducing your Waste. Dubbed "Bible for the zero waste pursuer" by Book Riot, it provides a simple to follow the methodology of 5R's with in-depth practical tips on how to eliminate waste in a household. Translated into 27 languages (as of 2019), the international bestseller helped spread the concept to a wide audience. Some of Bea's followers and readers went on to start their own blogs, such as Lauren Singer, an eco-activist living in New York, whose Social Media channels spread the concept to millennials, open package-free stores, such as Marie Delapierre, who opened the first unpackaged store in Germany (based on the model of Unpackaged, the first package-free concept in our modern era), launch non-profit organizations, such as Natalie Bino, founding member of Zero Waste Switzerland. Over the years, the Zero Waste lifestyle experienced a significant increase in followers. Thousands of social media channels, blogs, unpackaged stores, lines of reusables, and organizations have emerged worldwide. And in turn, the fast-evolving grass-root movement created a demand for large corporations, such as Unilever and Procter and Gamble, to conceive reusable alternatives to disposables.

2010 to Present 

The movement continues to grow among the youth around the world under the organization Zero Waste Youth, which originated in Brazil and has spread to Argentina, Puerto Rico, Mexico, the United States, and Russia. The organization multiplies with local volunteer ambassadors who lead zero waste gatherings and events to spread the zero waste message.

The International Day of Zero Waste was adopted by the United Nations General Assembly on December 14, 2022.  The event will be held annually on March 30 commencing in 2023.  "During International Day of Zero Waste, Member States, organizations of the United Nations system, civil society, the private sector, academia, youth and other stakeholders are invited to engage in activities aimed at raising awareness of national, subnational, regional and local zero-waste initiatives and their contribution to achieving sustainable development. The United Nations Environment Programme (UNEP) and the United Nations Human Settlements Programme (UN-Habitat) jointly facilitate the observance of International Day of Zero Waste."

Model of Change 

Behavior change is a central factor, necessary for shifting to more sustainable waste management but there is a lack of research with regards to behavior change intervention. Critics of Zero Waste  point out that a material could be reusable, organic, non-toxic, and renewable but still be ethically inferior to single use products. Bags made of baby seal pelts or tiger skin, for example, theoretically meet the definitions of "zero waste", but are hardly superior to single use plastic bags. Similarly, a toxic material, such as lead in solder, may be replaced by less toxic materials like tin and silver. But if the mining of silver and tin releases more mercury or damages sensitive coral islands, the protection of landfills in developed nations is hardly paramount. While zero waste advocates  are able to provide logically sound answers as to why these examples do not meet the definition of Zero Waste (e.g., that the bodies of seals and tigers, or mining waste, are of equal concern), critics say that Life Cycle Analysis, habitat protection, carbon neutralization, or "Zero Extinction" are more environmentally astute philosophies than waste-centric measures. The simple accounting of measurable waste diversion, reuse, recycling rates, etc. is an attractive and useful tool, but a campaign based on a goal of literally stopping the last 5% of waste might come at the expense of other environmental and sustainability goals.

Within the waste industry itself, other tensions exist between those who view zero waste as post-discard total recycling of materials only and those who view zero waste as the reuse of all high-level functions. It is probably the defining difference between established recyclers and emerging zero-wasters. A signature example is a difference between smashing a glass bottle (recovering cheap glass) and refilling the bottle (recovering the entire function of the container).
	
The tension between the literal application of natural processes and the creation of industry-specific more efficient reuse modalities is another tension. Many observers look to nature as an ultimate model for production and innovative materials. Others point out that industrial products are inherently non-natural (such as chemicals and plastics that are mono-molecular) and benefit greatly from industrial methods of reuse, while natural methods requiring degradation and reconstitution are wasteful in that context..
	
Whether made of starch or petroleum, the manufacturing process expends all the same materials and energy costs. Factories are built, raw materials are procured, investments are made, machinery is built and used, and humans labor and make use of all normal human inputs for education, housing, food etc. Even if the plastic is biodegraded after a single use, all of those costs are lost so it is much more important to design plastic parts for multiple reuse or perpetual lives. The other side argues that keeping plastic out of a dump or the sea is the sole benefit of interest.
	
Companies moving towards "zero landfill" plants include Subaru, Xerox and Anheuser-Busch.

Examples of zero waste

Milk can be shipped in many forms.  One of the traditional forms was reusable returnable glass milk bottles, often home delivered by a milkman. While some of this continues, other options have recently been more common: one-way gable-top paperboard cartons, one-way aseptic cartons, one-way recyclable glass bottles, one-way milk bags, and others. Each system claims some advantages and also has possible disadvantages. From the zero-waste standpoint, the reuse of bottles is beneficial because the material usage per trip can be less than other systems. The primary input (or resource) is silica-sand, which is formed into glass and then into a bottle. The bottle is filled with milk and distributed to the consumer. A reverse logistics system returns the bottles for cleaning, inspection, sanitization, and reuse. Eventually, the heavy-duty bottle would not be suited for further use and would be recycled. Waste and landfill usage would be minimized. The material waste is primarily the wash water, detergent, transportation, heat, bottle caps, etc. While true zero waste is never achieved, a life cycle assessment can be used to calculate the waste at each phase of each cycle.

Online shopping orders are often placed in an outer box to contain multiple items for easier transport and tracking. This creates waste for every order, especially when there is only a single item. In response, some products are now designed not to require an outer box for safe shipping, a feature known as ships in own container.

Recycling and composting 

	
It is important to distinguish recycling from Zero Waste. The most common practice of recycling is simply that of placing bottles, cans, paper, and packaging into curbside recycling bins. The modern version of recycling is more complicated and involves many more elements of financing and government support. For example, a 2007 report by the U.S. Environmental Protection Agency states that the US recycles at a national rate of 33.5% and includes in this figure composted materials. In addition, many multinational commodity companies have been created to handle recycled materials. At the same time, claims of recycling rates have sometimes been exaggerated, for example by the inclusion of soil and organic matter used to cover garbage dumps daily, in the "recycled" column. In US states with recycling incentives, there is constant local pressure to inflate recycling statistics.
	 
Recycling has been separated from the concept of zero waste. One example of this is the computer industry where worldwide millions of PC's are disposed of as electronic waste each year in 2016 44.7 million metric tons of electronic waste was generated of which only 20% was documented and recycled. Some computer manufacturers refurbish leased computers for resale. Community Organizations have also entered this space by refurbishing old computers from donation campaigns for distribution to undeserved communities.

Software recycling 
A clear example of the difference between zero waste and recycling is discussed in Getting to Zero Waste, in the software industry. Zero waste design can be applied to intellectual property where the effort to code functionality into software objects is developed by design as opposed to copying code snippets multiple times when needed. The application of zero waste is straightforward as it conserves human effort. Also, software storage mediums have transitioned from consumable diskettes to internal drives which are vastly superior and have a minimal cost per megabyte of storage. This is a physical example where zero waste correctly identifies and avoids wasteful behavior.

Use of zero waste system 

Zero waste is poorly supported by the enactment of government laws to enforce the waste hierarchy. 
	
A special feature of zero waste as a design principle is that it can be applied to any product or process, in any situation or at any level. Thus it applies equally to toxic chemicals as to benign plant matter. It applies to the waste of atmospheric purity by coal-burning or the waste of radioactive resources by attempting to designate the excesses of nuclear power plants as "nuclear waste". All processes can be designed to minimize the need for discard, both in their own operations and in the usage or consumption patterns which the design of their products leads to. Recycling, on the other hand, deals only with simple materials.
	
Zero waste can even be applied to the waste of human potential by enforced poverty and the denial of educational opportunity. It encompasses redesign for reduced energy wasting in industry or transportation and the wasting of the earth's rainforests. It is a general principle of designing for the efficient use of all resources, however defined.

The recycling movement may be slowly branching out from its solid waste management base to include issues that are similar to the community sustainability movement.
	 
Zero waste, on the other hand, is not based in waste management limitations to begin with but requires that we maximize our existing reuse efforts while creating and applying new methods that minimize and eliminate destructive methods like incineration and recycling. Zero waste strives to ensure that products are designed to be repaired, refurbished, re-manufactured and generally reused.

Significance of dump capacity 

Many dumps are currently exceeding carrying capacity. This is often used as a justification for moving to Zero Waste. Others counter by pointing out that there are huge tracts of land available throughout the US and other countries which could be used for dumps. Proposals abound to destroy all garbage as a way to solve the garbage problem. These proposals typically claim to convert all or a large portion of existing garbage into oil and sometimes claim to produce so much oil that the world will henceforth have abundant liquid fuels. One such plan, called Anything Into Oil, was promoted by Discover Magazine and Fortune Magazine in 2004 and claimed to be able to convert a refrigerator into "light Texas crude" by the application of high-pressure steam.

Corporate initiatives 

An example of a company that has demonstrated a change in landfill waste policy is General Motors (GM). GM has confirmed their plans to make approximately half of its 181 plants worldwide "landfill-free" by the end of 2010. Companies like Subaru, Toyota, and Xerox are also producing landfill-free plants. Furthermore, The United States Environmental Protection Agency (EPA) has worked with GM and other companies for decades to minimize the waste through its WasteWise program. The goal for General Motors is finding ways to recycle or reuse more than 90% of materials by: selling scrap materials, adopting reusable boxes to replace cardboard, and even recycling used work gloves. The remainder of the scraps might be incinerated to create energy for the plants. Besides being nature-friendly, it also saves money by cutting out waste and producing a more efficient production. Microsoft and Google are two other big companies that have Zero Waste goals. These two companies have goals to keep the majority of their waste out of landfills. Google has six locations that have a Zero Waste to Landfill goal. These locations have a goal to keep 100% of their waste out of landfills. Microsoft has a similar goal, but they are only trying to keep 90% their waste out of landfills.   All these organizations push forth to make our world clean and producing zero waste.

A garden centre in Faversham, UK, has started to prevent plastic plant pots from being passed down to customers. Instead, it reuses the plastic pots only locally in the garden center, but upon selling it to its customers it repots the plants in paper plant pots. It also sells plants wrapped in hessian, and uses a variety of techniques to prevent handing down (single-use) plastics to customers

Re-use or rot of waste 

The waste sent to landfills may be harvested as useful materials, such as in the production of solar energy or natural fertilizer/de-composted manure for crops.

It may also be reused and recycled for something that we can actually use. "The success of General Motors in creating zero-landfill facilities shows that zero-waste goals can be a powerful impetus for manufacturers to reduce their waste and carbon footprint," says Latisha Petteway, a spokesperson for the EPA.

Market-based campaigns

Market-based, legislation-mediated campaigns like extended producer responsibility (EPR) and the precautionary principle are among numerous campaigns that have a Zero Waste slogan hung on them by means of claims they all ineluctably lead to policies of Zero Waste. At the moment, there is no evidence that EPR will increase reuse, rather than merely moving discard and disposal into private-sector dumping contracts. The Precautionary Principle is put forward to shift liability for proving new chemicals are safe from the public (acting as guinea pig) to the company introducing them. As such, its relation to Zero Waste is dubious. Likewise, many organizations, cities and counties have embraced a Zero Waste slogan while pressing for none of the key Zero Waste changes. In fact, it is common for many such to simply state that recycling is their entire goal. Many commercial or industrial companies claim to embrace Zero Waste but usually mean no more than a major materials recycling effort, having no bearing on product redesign. Examples include Staples, Home Depot, Toyota, General Motors and computer take-back campaigns. Earlier social justice campaigns have successfully pressured McDonald's to change their meat purchasing practices and Nike to change its labor practices in Southeast Asia. Those were both based on the idea that organized consumers can be active participants in the economy and not just passive subjects. However, the announced and enforced goal of the public campaign is critical. A goal to reduce waste generation or dumping through greater recycling will not achieve a goal of product redesign and so cannot reasonably be called a Zero Waste campaign. Producers should be made responsible for the packaging of the products rather than the consumers in EPR like campaigns by which the participation of the Producers will increase.

How to achieve

National and provincial governments often set targets and may provide some funding, but on a practical level, waste management programs (e.g. pickup, drop-off, or containers for recycling and composting) are usually implemented by local governments, possibly with regionally shared facilities.

Reaching the goal of zero waste requires the products of manufacturers and industrial designers to be easily disassembled for recycling and incorporated back into nature or the industrial system; durability and repairability also reduce unnecessary churn in the product life cycle. Minimizes packaging also solves many problems early in the supply chain. If not mandated by government, choices by retailers and consumers in favor of zero-waste-friendly products can influence production. More and more schools are motivating their students to live a different life and rethink every polluting step they may take. To prevent material from becoming waste, consumers, businesses, and non-profits must be educated in how to reduce waste and recycle successfully.

The 5 R’s of Bea Johnson

In the book Zero Waste Home: The Ultimate Guide to Simplifying your Life by Reducing your Waste the author, Bea Johnson, provides a modified version of the 3 Rs, the 5 Rs: Refuse, Reduce, Reuse, Recycle, Rot to achieve Zero Waste at home. The method, which she developed through years of practicing waste free living and used to reduce her family's annual trash to fit in a pint jar, is now widely used by individuals, businesses and municipalities worldwide.

Zero Waste Hierarchy
The Zero Waste Hierarchy describes a progression of policies and strategies to support the zero-waste system, from highest and best to lowest use of materials. It is designed to be applicable to all audiences, from policy-makers to industry and the individual.  It aims to provide more depth to the internationally recognized 3Rs (Reduce, Reuse, Recycle); to encourage policy, activity and investment at the top of the hierarchy; and to provide a guide for those who wish to develop systems or products that move us closer to zero waste. It enhances the zero-waste definition by providing guidance for planning and a way to evaluate proposed solutions. All over the world, in some form or another, a pollution prevention hierarchy is incorporated into recycling regulations, solid waste management plans, and resource conservation programs. In Canada, a pollution prevention hierarchy otherwise referred to as the Environmental Protection Hierarchy was adopted. This Hierarchy has been incorporated into all recycling regulations within Canada and is embedded within all resource conservation methods which all government mandated waste prevention programs follow. While the intention to incorporate the 4th R (recovery)prior to disposal was good, many organizations focused on this 4th R instead of the top of the hierarchy resulting in costly systems designed to destroy materials instead of systems designed to reduce environmental impact and waste. Because of this, along with other resource destruction systems that have been emerging over the past few decades, Zero Waste Canada along with the Zero Waste International Alliance have adopted the only internationally peer reviewed Zero Waste Hierarchy that focuses on the first 3Rs; Reduce, Reuse and Recycle including Compost.

Zero waste jurisdictions

Various governments have declared zero waste as a goal, including:

 Brazil
 Florianópolis, Santa Catarina
 Canada
 Vancouver (see Zero Waste 2040 Strategy)
 Italy
 Capannori, Tuscany

 Japan
 Kamikatsu, Tokushima recycles 80% of its waste at the Kamikatsu Zero Waste Center, and aims for zero waste.
Sweden (Country wide)
United States
 Austin, Texas
 Boulder, Colorado
 Fort Collins, Colorado
 Chula Vista, California
 Minneapolis, Minnesota
 San Francisco, California
 San Jose, California

An example of network governance approach can be seen in the UK under New Labour who proposed the establishment of regional groupings that brought together the key stakeholders in waste management (local authority representatives, waste industry, government offices etc.) on a voluntary basis. There is a lack of clear government policy on how to meet the targets for diversion from landfill which increases the scope at the regional and local level for governance networks. The overall goal is set by government but the route for how to achieve it is left open, so stakeholders can coordinate and decide how best to reach it.

Zero Waste is a strategy promoted by environmental NGOs but the waste industry is more in favor of the capital intensive option of energy from waste incineration. Research often highlights public support as the first requirement for success. In Taiwan, public opinion was essential in changing the attitude of business, who must transform their material use pattern to become more sustainable for Zero Waste to work.

California is a leading state in the United States for having zero-waste goals. California is the state with the most cities in the Zero Waste International Alliance. According to the United States Environmental Protection Agency, multiple cities have defined what it means to be a Zero Waste community and adopted goals to reach that status. Some of these cities include Fresno, Los Angeles, Oakland, San Francisco, Pasadena, Alameda, and San Jose. San Francisco has defined zero waste as "zero discards to the landfill or high-temperature destruction." Here, there is a planned structure to reach Zero Waste through three steps recommended by the San Francisco Department of the Environment. These steps are to prevent waste, reduce and reuse, and recycle and compost. Los Angeles defines zero waste as "maximizing diversion from landfills and reducing waste at the source, with the ultimate goal of striving for more-sustainable solid waste management practices." Los Angeles plans to reach this goal by the year of 2025. To reach this goal, major changes will have to be made to product creation, use, and disposal.

Zero-waste stores

Retail stores specializing in zero-waste products have opened in various countries, including Spain and the United States.

See also

Bea Johnson
Composting
Environmentalism
Nursery pots
Miniwaste
Paul Connett
Phase-out of lightweight plastic bags
Precycling
Source reduction
Sustainable packaging
Throwaway society
Waste
Whole-life cost
Zero waste agriculture
Zero-waste fashion
Waste management

References

Further reading

Mauch, Christof, ed. "A Future without Waste? Zero Waste in Theory and Practice," RCC Perspectives: Transformations in Environment and Society 2016, no. 3. doi.org/10.5282/rcc/7540.

External links

Advocacy organizations
Zero Waste Institute
Zero Waste Network
Zero Waste International Alliance (ZWIA)
Zero Waste Alliance

	

Waste management concepts
Industrial ecology
Waste minimisation